Mind the Gap: London vs the Rest is a British factual television series that was first broadcast on BBC Two on 3 March 2014. The two-part series is presented by Evan Davis and is about the economic forces in Britain.

Episode list

References

External links
 
 

2014 British television series debuts
2014 British television series endings
Television shows set in the United Kingdom
BBC television documentaries
English-language television shows